Olav Økern (3 June 1911 – 11 April 2000) was a Norwegian cross-country skier who competed in the 1930s and 1940s. He won a bronze in the 4 × 10 km relay at the 1948 Winter Olympics in St. Moritz.

In addition, he won a silver in the 4 × 10 km relay at the 1938 FIS Nordic World Ski Championships and the 18 km event at the 1940 Holmenkollen ski festival. Because of those wins, Økern earned the Holmenkollen medal in 1950. His uncle, Harald Økern, had earned the same medal in 1924.

Cross-country skiing results
All results are sourced from the International Ski Federation (FIS).

Olympic Games
 1 medal – (1 bronze)

World Championships
 1 medal – (1 silver)

References

External links

Holmenkollen medalists - click Holmenkollmedaljen for downloadable pdf file 
Holmenkollen winners since 1892 - click Vinnere for downloadable pdf file 

1911 births
2000 deaths
Norwegian male cross-country skiers
Olympic cross-country skiers of Norway
Cross-country skiers at the 1948 Winter Olympics
Cross-country skiers at the 1952 Winter Olympics
Olympic bronze medalists for Norway
Holmenkollen medalists
Holmenkollen Ski Festival winners
Olympic medalists in cross-country skiing
FIS Nordic World Ski Championships medalists in cross-country skiing
Medalists at the 1948 Winter Olympics